James Turner Brewer (born December 3, 1951) is an American former National Basketball Association (NBA) player.

Brewer was the first notable player to come out of Proviso East High School, which has one of the most successful high school basketball programs in Illinois. In 1969, Brewer, playing center, led his team to the first of four state championships. Brewer was followed at Proviso East by other future NBA players, notably Doc Rivers, Michael Finley, Dee Brown, Shannon Brown, Sterling Brown, and JeVon Carter.

The 6'9" 210-pound forward then attended the University of Minnesota. One of his teammates was future Baseball Hall-of-Famer Dave Winfield. He is infamous for his role in a 1972 brawl in Minneapolis, where white Ohio State center Luke Witte was assaulted by fellow Gophers Corky Taylor and Ron Behagen in a game. The fight escalated when Brewer repeatedly struck Witte's white teammate Dave Merchant in the face.

Brewer played in the 1972 Summer Olympics, including the United States' controversial loss to the Soviet Union in the gold medal game, being violently injured by Alexander Belov during the free-throw in the second half and unable to continue playing. The referees failed to properly assess the flagrant foul. After the Olympics, Brewer was drafted by the Cleveland Cavaliers in the first round (2nd pick) of the 1973 NBA draft.

Whenever Brewer scored a basket at a Cavaliers home game, the public address announcer would declare, "Two for the Brew!"  Brewer played nine seasons in the NBA from 1973 to 1982.  Then he played with Pallacanestro Cantù in Italian Serie A along with players as Pierluigi Marzorati and Antonello Riva with coach Giancarlo Primo. He won a Euroleague and was an Intercontinental Cup finalist.

Brewer is the uncle of former NBA player and current Philadelphia 76ers head coach Glenn "Doc" Rivers and the great uncle of Doc's son, Denver Nuggets point guard, Austin Rivers.

In 2007, the Illinois High School Association named Brewer one of the 100 Legends of the IHSA Boys Basketball Tournament.

Notes

External links
 

1951 births
Living people
21st-century African-American people
African-American basketball coaches
African-American basketball players
All-American college men's basketball players
American expatriate basketball people in Canada
American expatriate basketball people in Italy
American men's basketball players
Basketball coaches from Illinois
Basketball players at the 1972 Summer Olympics
Basketball players from Illinois
Boston Celtics assistant coaches
Cleveland Cavaliers draft picks
Cleveland Cavaliers players
Detroit Pistons players
Los Angeles Lakers players
Medalists at the 1972 Summer Olympics
Minnesota Golden Gophers men's basketball players
Minnesota Timberwolves assistant coaches
Olympic silver medalists for the United States in basketball
Pallacanestro Cantù players
Parade High School All-Americans (boys' basketball)
Portland Trail Blazers players
Power forwards (basketball)
Sportspeople from Maywood, Illinois
Toronto Raptors assistant coaches
United States men's national basketball team players
20th-century African-American sportspeople